The 1989 North Atlantic Conference men's basketball tournament was hosted by the Hartford Hawks at the Hartford Civic Center. Only the top-8 schools made it to the 1989 tournament, therefore excluding both New Hampshire and Vermont. Siena College gained its only America East Conference Championship and an automatic berth to the NCAA tournament with its win over Boston University. Siena was given the 14th seed in the East Regional of the NCAA Tournament and lost in the second round to Minnesota 80–67, after upsetting #3 Stanford 80–78.

Bracket and Results

See also
America East Conference

References

America East Conference men's basketball tournament
1988–89 North Atlantic Conference men's basketball season